NWA Roller Derby (Northwest Arkansas Roller Derby) is a flat track roller derby league based in Fayetteville, Arkansas, (USA). Founded in early 2006, NWA Roller Derby were the first flat track league in Arkansas to play a version of roller derby using new standardized rules and a track design that was based on the dimensions of the old banked tracks, made popular by the founders of modern roller derby, the Texas Rollergirls. NWA Roller Derby also became the first member league out of Arkansas of the national organization, the Women's Flat Track Derby Association, announced by the WFTDA in December 2007.

As of July, 2018 NWA Roller Derby were accepted by the I.R.S. as a 501(c)3 charitable organization.

The league has been featured in reports on KNWA-TV, and the Arkansas Democrat-Gazette.  By late 2010, NWA was one of three flat-track derby leagues in Arkansas.

History
The early beginnings of NWA Roller Derby consisted of two home teams, the Twisted Sisters and the Hardwood Harlots. Their first public bout, "Fright Night Fight", was held on October 18, 2006. A game in January 2007 drew over 1000 fans. Over the course of 2007 NWA Roller Derby held home bouts between the two teams for the general public while also premiering their newly created all-star team, the Arkansas Killbillies, a combination of top players from both home teams. At the end of 2007 NWA Roller Derby dissolved their home teams in favor of a league format consisting of two travel teams, the Arkansas Killbillies (all-star team) and the Backwoods Betties.

WFTDA competition
NWA Roller Derby consists of the All Star Team and a B Team; the All Star team competes for WFTDA Rankings.

Rankings

References

Roller derby leagues established in 2006
Roller derby leagues in Arkansas
Sports in Fayetteville, Arkansas
2006 establishments in Arkansas